"Don't Be Shy" is a song by Canadian rapper Belly. It's the second single from his debut album The Revolution (2007). The song features R&B girl group Nina Sky who sing the chorus.

Music video
Directed by Dan the Man, the video features Belly and Nina Sky performing behind backgrounds of various colors. There are appearances of female dancers in black and gold attire, various automobiles, 
a jaguar and a tiger that Belly has on a gold chain.

Chart performance
The song debut at number 62 on the week of June 16, 2007. A week later, it hit a new peak at number 45. It stayed on the chart for an additional nine weeks.

References

2007 singles
Belly (rapper) songs
Nina Sky songs
CP Music Group singles
Songs written by Belly (rapper)
2007 songs